The Ecstall Greenstone Belt is a north-northwest trending greenstone belt in northwestern British Columbia, Canada. It is located in the Kitimat Ranges of the Coast Mountains between the communities of Prince Rupert and Kitimat, in the vicinity of the Ecstall River. Metavolcanic and metasedimentary rocks as well as quartzite and layered gneiss comprise the Ecstall Greenstone Belt.

See also
List of greenstone belts

References

Geologic formations of British Columbia
Greenstone belts
Kitimat Ranges